Iron Brew is a caramel-coloured carbonated soft drink sold in South Africa. It has been sold by Coca-Cola since 1975, and is currently marketed as part of the Sparletta range. They describe the flavour as "rosy vanilla, fruity". A number of other manufacturers also offer Iron Brew soft drinks.

See also
 List of soft drinks by country
 Irn Bru

References 

 

South African drinks
South African brands
Coca-Cola brands